Hippotragus  is a genus of antelopes which includes two living and one recently extinct species, as well as some fossil relatives. The name comes from Greek ἵππος (híppos), "horse", and τράγος (trágos), "he-goat".

Fossil species
†Hippotragus gigas
†Hippotragus cookei? - may be a nomen dubium

References

External links

Grazing antelopes
Mammal genera
Taxa named by Thaddeus William Harris